The Stavropol electoral district was a constituency created for the 1917 Russian Constituent Assembly election. The electoral district covered the Stavropol Governorate, as well as the Karanogai precinct (which was part of the Terek Oblast).

The Stavropol District Electoral Commission for the Constituent Assembly was set-up August 12, 1917, with V. M. Krasnov, prosecutor of the Stavropol District Court, as its head. 319 voting centres, each covering about 2,000 voters, were set up across the electoral district. 46 candidates on 7 lists contested the election.

The SR and Peasant Soviet list was headed by F. M. Onipko, who was popular in the district. Joseph Stalin stood as a candidate on the Bolshevik list.

Voting lasted for three days, November 12–14. The two first days, the polling stations were opened between 9 a.m. and 9 p.m., whilst on November 14 the polling stations closed at 2 p.m. 88% of the eligible voters cast their ballots. In Stavropol town the Bolsheviks won 47.6% of the vote. Likewise, in Pyatigorsk the Bolsheviks won some 8,000 votes, half of the votes from the town.

Results

References

Electoral districts of the Russian Constituent Assembly election, 1917